The Choir of New College Oxford is part of the collegiate foundation of New College, Oxford, established by William of Wykeham in 1379. It is one of England's oldest choral foundations and is the oldest of its kind in Oxford and Cambridge, predating its sister college in Cambridge by more than sixty years. Consisting of approximately 16 boys and 14 men, it is one of the main choral foundations of the University of Oxford and is regarded as one of the leading choirs of the world. Under Edward Higginbottom, the choir was characterised by a robust sound that allowed individual voices to be heard, and has two Gramophone Awards to its name.

Membership
The choir is made up of choristers aged eight to thirteen who attend New College School, undergraduates (known as academical clerks) from the age of 18 who study at the college, and lay clerks - older, professional singers. The choir sings in the usual collegiate format of Decani and Cantoris, with seven men on either side. Historically, the gentlemen of the choir were solely lay clerks. It was only in the 1960s that the choir admitted its first undergraduate member - the young countertenor, James Bowman.

Recordings
Under the directorship of Edward Higginbottom, the choir rose to particular prominence in the 1990s with their platinum best-selling and award-winning Agnus Dei disc which includes Allegri's famous Miserere mei. The choir's discography rapidly grew under Higginbottom and now totals over 110 discs. A new chapter in the choir's recording life began in 2010 with the launch of its own label, Novum. Recordings represent a of music from the core of the English choral tradition (Howells, Stanford, Wesley, Blow, Britten, Ludford, Tomkins, Boyce, Croft, Taverner, Tye, Locke, Handel, Gibbons, Tallis and Byrd). Further projects include Bach's St John Passion and Motets, Monteverdi's Vespers, Haydn's Creation, as well as recordings of the music of Poulenc, MacMillan, Copland and the music of their contemporaries. Reflecting the interests of Edward Higginbottom, the choir has made important contributions to the performance and recording of French baroque music - in particular the music of Du Caurroy, Charpentier, Delalande, and Couperin. New College Choir have also made numerous recordings of continental polyphony including Lassus, Palestrina, and de Monte.

In 2008, the choir won its second Gramophone Award in the early music category for their recording of Nicholas Ludford's Missa Benedicta.

Tours
The choir began touring overseas in the 1960s under David Lumsden, who recognised the benefits it would bring to the choir as well as the reputation of the college. To compliment their considerable recording activity, New College Choir established a busy schedule of concerts and international touring taking the choir to countries as far afield as America, Australia, Japan, and Brazil. European tours have been a mainstay of the choir's international activity, with particular emphasis on France, Germany, Italy, Belgium, The Netherlands, the Czech Republic, and Hungary. On 29 June 2015 and 2016, at the invitation of the Holy See and the Cappella Musicale Pontificia Sistina, the choir sang at the Papal Pallium mass for the Solemnity of Saints Peter and Paul in St. Peter's Basilica.

Recent sabbaticals have allowed the choir to benefit from the musical direction of Paul Brough and Dr James Lancelot.

Organists and directors of music

Assistant Organists
Former assistant organists include:
 David Burchell
 Robert Patterson
 Matthew Martin
 Steven Grahl
 Timothy Wakerell
 Dónal McCann

Organ Scholars
Former organ scholars include:
 Paul Hale
 Patrick Russill
 Geoffery Webber
 Nicholas Wearne
 Lawrence Thain
 Ben Bloor
 Josef Laming
 Charles Maxtone-Smith
 Hamish Fraser

Notable former choir members
 James Bowman
 James Gilchrist - former chorister
 Robert Hollingworth - conductor of I Fagiolini
 Jeremy Summerly - academical clerk
 Howard Goodall
 Nicholas Pritchard - tenor academical clerk
 Guy Cutting - tenor academical clerk
 David Hurley - long-time alto of The King's Singers
 Rogers Covey-Crump - former chorister
 Philip Cave
 Matthew Venner
 Ian Patridge - former chorister
 David Clegg
 Alexander Potter
 Toby Spence
 James Geidt
 Paul Spicer - former treble
 Simon Halsey
 Daniel Norman
 Matthew Beale

References

External links 
 Official website

New
Musical groups established in the 14th century
New College, Oxford
New
1379 establishments in England